Mathieu Texier (born February 1, 1981) is a footballer, currently playing for Championnat National side US Luzenac as a defensive midfielder.

See also
Football in France
List of football clubs in France

References

External links
Mathieu Texier profile at chamoisfc79.fr

1981 births
Living people
French footballers
Association football midfielders
Chamois Niortais F.C. players
Luzenac AP players
Ligue 2 players
FC Aurillac Arpajon Cantal Auvergne players